Soft Power Records was a Scottish independent record label and online record shop based in Livingston, West Lothian and active from 2010 to 2016. It was founded by Bek & Graeme Galloway. It specialised in indie and noise pop music.

All of their releases were in an analogue format (though accompanied by digital downloads), usually vinyl records or cassette.

Artists released by Soft Power
Aggi Doom
Beat Mark
Big Wave
Blood Of The Bull
Cruising
The Debutantes
Dirty Beaches
Dog Legs
Dora Maar
H. Grimace
The Hollows
Holy Motors
HUNK!
Kaspar Hauser
Obedient Wives Club
Conor Prendergast
The Rosy Crucifixion
September Girls
The Spook School
The Tamborines
Theoretical Girl
Trogons
The Wharves
Witching Waves
Wolf Girl

References

Underground punk scene in the United Kingdom
British independent record labels
Indie rock record labels
Record labels established in 2010
Indie pop record labels